The Senorita Stakes is an American flat Thoroughbred horse race for three-year-old fillies held annually at Santa Anita Park in Arcadia, California. 

The race began in 1968 at the now-closed Hollywood Park in Inglewood, California. It was moved to Santa Anita Park upon Hollywood Park's closure at the end of the 2013 season. 

As of 2017, it is a Grade III race run over a distance of 8 furlongs on turf offering a purse of $100,000.

Winners of the Senorita Stakes since 1991

Earlier winners 

 1990 - Brought to Mind
 1989 - Reluctant Guest
 1988 - Do So
 1987 - Pen Bal Lady
 1986 - Nature's Way
 1985 - Akamini
 1985 - Shywing
 1984 - Heartlight
 1983 - Stage Door Canteen
 1983 - Preceptress
 1982 - Skillful Joy
 1981 - Shimmy
 1980 - Ballare
 1979 - Variety Queen
 1978 - Blue Blood
 1977 - Glenaris
 1976 - Now Pending
 1975 - Raise Your Skirts
 1974 - no race
 1973 - Cellist
 1972 - Impressive Style
 1971 - Shelf Talker
 1971 - Turkish Trousers
 1970 - Night Staker
 1969 - Prove it Girl
 1969 - Commissary
 1968 - Time to Leave

References
Hollywood Park official website

Horse races in California
Santa Anita Park
Flat horse races for three-year-old fillies
Turf races in the United States
Graded stakes races in the United States